KSBP-LP (101.1 FM) was a radio station licensed to Parachute, Colorado, United States. The station was owned by KSUN Community Radio.

History
The station was assigned the call letters KSBP-LP on 2002-01-02.

On February 1, 2016, KSUN Community Radio surrendered the station's license to the Federal Communications Commission (FCC). The FCC cancelled the license and deleted KSBP-LP's call sign from its database on February 5.

References

External links
 

SBP-LP
SBP-LP
Radio stations established in 2003
2003 establishments in Colorado
Defunct radio stations in the United States
Radio stations disestablished in 2016
2016 disestablishments in Colorado
Defunct community radio stations in the United States
SBP-LP